is a 1939 black-and-white Japanese film directed by Eisuke Takizawa.

Cast 
 Kazuo Hasegawa

References

External links 
 http://www.asahi-net.or.jp/~uy7k-ymst/hhei1/hkch2.htm
 

Japanese black-and-white films
1939 films